The 1864 Franklin by-election was a by-election held on 13 October 1864 in the  electorate during the 3rd New Zealand Parliament.

The by-election was caused by the death of the incumbent MP Marmaduke Nixon on 27 May 1864, killed during the New Zealand Wars.

The by-election was won by Theodore Haultain. As no other candidates were nominated, he was declared duly elected.

References

Franklin, 1864
1864 elections in New Zealand
Politics of the Auckland Region
October 1864 events